Skarpyon is a Ragga Soca artist from Saint Vincent and the Grenadines. He has performed through the Caribbean. He has a few songs released, which are "On Fire", "Looking Fine" and "Turn Your Lights Down Low". His songs are featured on "D'soca Zone: The 7th Flag Up" and "Soca Explosion 2006".

External links
 Last.fm profile

Year of birth missing (living people)
Living people
Soca musicians
Saint Vincent and the Grenadines musicians
Place of birth missing (living people)